Rizhao West railway station is a railway station located in Donggang District, Rizhao, Shandong, China.

History
The station opened as Kuishan Town railway station in 1985. It was renamed Rizhao West on 1 July 2018. Services on the Qingdao–Yancheng railway began on 26 December 2018. Services on the Rizhao–Qufu high-speed railway began on 26 November 2019.

See also
Rizhao railway station

References 
 

Railway stations in Shandong
Railway stations in China opened in 1985